is a video game developer and division of Koei Tecmo Games, known for their Atelier franchise.

Company
  was founded in 1993 in Nagano, Japan, as the first game software house in Nagano Prefecture. The company began by creating dōjinshi games for personal computers. In 1994 the company became an official developer for the Sony PlayStation video game console, and its first PlayStation product was the simulation game . In 1997, Gust released Atelier Marie, the first game in the long-running, popular, and iconic Atelier series. Since then the company has released several successful games for various home and portable video game systems.

On December 7, 2011 Japanese publisher Koei Tecmo acquired the company from its previous owner Keiken Holdings for 2.2 billion yen as a wholly owned subsidiary. It was announced on July 28, 2014 that Gust will be absorbed by its parent company Koei Tecmo on October 1, 2014, and will continue to develop existing game series and new intellectual properties as "Gust Nagano Development Group".

In 2015, Gust released a new site called "Gust Social" exclusively for its social games, starting with Nights of Azure, Atelier Sophie and Ciel Nosurge as the first advertised, for the purpose of improving communication with fan feedback. The website allows for fans to make a Gust ID account which allows them to participate in surveys, buy products from the Gust online store, and a variety of other related content. Additionally, the Gust Social serves as an active news site for its new social games.

In March 2020, Gust transferred from its building in Nagano to the newly completed Koei Tecmo head office in Minato Mirai 21.

Games
Games developed by Gust are known for their alchemy and item-crafting systems, distinctive character designs, and traditional or "old-school" graphical and storytelling style. In Japan, Gust has published its own games or cooperated with Banpresto. In North America, these games are published by NIS America. After the acquisition by Koei Tecmo, all games are published by them.

Cancelled

Other media
Gust sells various licensed goods of their products from their online shop, such as anime, manga, music CDs, and drama CDs.

Gust maintains an extensive official fan-oriented web site, Salburg.com, featuring game information, news, contests, write-in columns, employee journals, fan-participation campaigns, mini-games, and shopping.

Notes

References

External links
  

Video game companies established in 1993
Japanese companies established in 1993
Koei Tecmo
Video game companies of Japan
Video game development companies
Video game publishers
Companies based in Nagano Prefecture
2011 mergers and acquisitions